Ramaria formosa, commonly known as the salmon coral, beautiful clavaria, handsome clavaria, yellow-tipped- or pink coral fungus, is a coral fungus found in Europe and Asia. It is widely held to be mildly poisonous if consumed, giving rise to acute gastrointestinal symptoms of nausea, vomiting, diarrhea and colicky pain. Similar forms collected in North America are now considered to represent a different species than the Eurasian Ramaria formosa.

Taxonomy
The fungus was initially described by Christian Hendrik Persoon in 1797 as Clavaria formosa. In 1821, Elias Magnus Fries sanctioned the genus name Clavaria, and treated Ramaria as a section of Clavaria. It was placed in its current genus by French mycologist Lucien Quélet in 1888. Synonyms have resulted from transfers of the fungus to the now obsolete genera Merisma by Harald Othmar Lenz in 1831, and to Corallium by Gotthold Hahn in 1883.

The generic name is derived from Latin rāmus 'branch', while the specific epithet comes from the Latin formōsus 'beautiful'. Common names include salmon coral, beautiful clavaria, handsome clavaria, yellow-tipped- or pink coral fungus.  There is some confusion over its classification as there is evidence the binomial name has been applied loosely to any coral fungus fitting the description, and thus the collections from North America are now considered to be a different species.

Description
The flesh is white, with pink in the middle, or pale orange. It may turn wine-coloured or blackish when bruised. Old specimens fade so the original colour is hard to distinguish. The smell is unpleasant and taste bitter. Old specimens dry out and become brittle and chalk-like, so that rubbing the branches between one's fingers crumbles them into powder.

Ramaria formosa produces a golden-yellow spore print. The spores have a cylindrical to elliptical shape, and measure 8–15 by 4–6 µm. The spore surface features small warts that are arranged in confluent lines. Basidia (spore-bearing cells) are club-shaped, measuring 40–60 by 7–10 µm, and have one to four sterigmata. In the stalk, the hyphae comprising the flesh are interwoven, while hyphae in the branches have a more parallel arrangement. Both types measure 4–13 µm wide. Some of the hyphae are gloeoplerous, meaning they have an oily or granular appearance when viewed under the microscope. Clamp connections are present in the hyphae. Iron salts applied to the branches will cause a green colour change.

Similar species
There are several other Ramaria species with yellow-tipped, salmon-coloured branches, including R. leptoformosa, R. neoformosa, R. raveneliana and  R. rubricarnata. These are distinguished from R. formosa most reliably using microscopic characteristics. A general rule is to avoid all old coral fungi for consumption.

Distribution and habitat
Fruiting in autumn, Ramaria formosa is associated with beech and is found in Asia (Yunnan, China and India) and Europe.  Forms from the western areas are known to occur under conifers. In Cyprus, the fungus is thought to form mycorrhizal associations with golden oak (Quercus alnifolia).

Toxicity
Consumption of the fungus results in acute gastrointestinal symptoms of nausea, vomiting, colicky abdominal pain and diarrhea. The toxins responsible are unknown to date. It has been reported as edible if the acrid tips are removed. Toxicity notwithstanding, the fungus is used as a traditional medicine by the Gurjar and Bakarwal tribes in the Rajouri and Poonch districts of India. Fruit bodies are eaten with food after cooking, in the belief that they relieve body pain. The fungus is also sold in markets in Lijiang, China.

References

External links

Gomphaceae
Poisonous fungi
Fungi described in 1797
Fungi of Asia
Fungi of Europe
Fungi of North America